The Light Phone is a brand of mobile phones by Light; a startup company in Brooklyn, New York, that creates technology products advertised as "designed to be used as little as possible". The Light Phone was conceived as a reaction against problematic smartphone use, with the discussion of apps and services such as email, social media, and web browsers being a key focus of the brand's production and marketing.

Light Phone

Release 
During its campaign, the Light Phone raised $415,127 from 3,187 backers, over double their goal of US$200,000.

Features and specifications 
The Light Phone is only capable of making and receive phone calls, and store up to 10 speed dial numbers. The phone came with a prepaid 2G SIM card with 500 minutes of call time and had its own phone number. The phone's buttons were visible from lights behind them, and it featured a small two tone analog digital display. It also had a headphone jack for phone calls. 

Phone calls received by a user's smartphone can be sent to a Light Phone with a smartphone app. This app displays contact names if a number has a name on the user's smartphone.

Light Phone II

Release 
The Light Phone II is designed to be a standalone mobile phone, unlike its predecessor. The project was crowdfunded, raising $3,513,838 by 10,732 backers.

Features and specifications 
The Light Phone II comes in two colors, light grey and black, and has a 2.84-inch two color e-ink display. It can connect via Bluetooth, a headphone jack, cellular, or micro USB. It also runs on 4G. It can send and receive texts and calls, hold more than nine contacts, set alarms, play music and podcasts, and run a Wi-Fi hotspot.

Light OS 
The Light Phone II runs an Android-based operating system called Light OS, developed by Light. Consumers have found ways to jailbreak it to access Android. In future iterations of Light OS, more features and services are planned to be added, including a calendar, notes, and ridesharing.

References

External links
 The Light Phone
Light Phone 2 – A phone that actually respects you. (Indiegogo Video)

Mobile phones introduced in 2017